Machilus wangchiana is a tree of the Lauraceae family and is an avocado species endemic to China.

It was described in 1953 by the botanist Woon Young Chun in 1953 and was published in Acta Phytotaxonomica Sinica. It has two synonyms; Persea wangchiana and Persea kadooriei which was described by the botanist André Joseph Guillaume Henri Kostermans in 1981 as published in Journal of South African Botany.

References

wangchiana
Plants described in 1953
Flora of China